An Introduction to ..... is a 1994 compilation album by Roy Harper.

History
The album features 13 Harper songs from a 25-year period and is "...a collection of various styles and periods...purely intended for people who may not know where to start (with Harpers music)." Roy Harper

Track listing
All tracks credited to Roy Harper
"Legend" – 3:46 (from Sophisticated Beggar)
"She's The One" – 6:57 (from Folkjokeopus)
"Tom Tiddler's Ground" – 6:50 (from Flat Baroque and Berserk)
"Highway Blues" – 6:34 (from Lifemask)
"Che" – 3:05 (from Valentine)
"Hallucinating Light" – 6:24 (from HQ)
"One Of Those Days In England" – 3:27 (from Bullinamingvase)
"You" – 4:35 (from The Unknown Soldier)
"Nineteen Forty-Eightish" – 9:35 (from Whatever Happened to Jugula?)
"Pinches Of Salt" – 3:08 (from Descendants of Smith)
"Ghost Dance" – 3:53 (from Once)
"The Tallest Tree" – 4:55 (from Death or Glory?)
"Miles Remains" – 8:52 (from Death or Glory?)

Personnel 

Roy Harper – guitar and vocals
Jimmy Page – guitar
Kate Bush – vocals
Colin Curwood – photography

References

External links 
Roy Harper Official Site
Excellent Roy Harper resource

Roy Harper (singer) compilation albums
1994 compilation albums